Lygodesmia grandiflora, the largeflower skeletonplant or showy rushpink, is a perennial plant in the family Asteraceae found in the Colorado Plateau and Canyonlands region of the southwestern United States.

Its stems are thin and flexuous. The narrow leaves are larger towards the base. Unusually for its family, it has no disc florets. It flowers early in summer.

References

grandiflora
Flora of the Colorado Plateau and Canyonlands region
Flora of the Southwestern United States
Flora without expected TNC conservation status